The Dead Zone is a 1983 American science-fiction thriller film directed by David Cronenberg. The screenplay, by Jeffrey Boam, is based on the 1979 novel of the same name by Stephen King. The film stars Christopher Walken, Brooke Adams, Tom Skerritt, Herbert Lom, Martin Sheen, Anthony Zerbe, and Colleen Dewhurst. Walken plays a schoolteacher, Johnny Smith, who awakens from a coma to find he has psychic powers. The film received positive reviews. The novel also inspired a television series of the same name in the early 2000s, starring Anthony Michael Hall, the 2-hour pilot episode of which borrowed some ideas and changes used in the 1983 film.

In the novel, the phrase "dead zone" refers to the part of Johnny Smith's brain that is irreparably damaged, resulting in his dormant psychic potential awakening. When some information in Johnny's visions is beyond his perception, he considers that information as existing "in the dead zone." In the film adaptation, the phrase "dead zone" is that part of his psychic vision that is missing — a blank area that he cannot see. This "dead zone" refers to an outcome that is not yet determined, meaning Johnny can change the future.

Plot
After having a headache following a ride on a roller coaster in Castle Rock, Maine, schoolteacher Johnny Smith politely declines when his girlfriend Sarah asks if he wants to spend the night with her. As he drives home through stormy weather, he has a car accident that leaves him in a coma. Awakening under the care of neurologist Dr. Sam Weizak, Johnny learns that five years have passed, and Sarah is now a married mother.

Johnny discovers that he has gained the ability to psychically see aspects of people's lives (past, present, and future) through physical contact. As he touches a nurse's hand, he sees her daughter trapped in a fire. He also sees that Weizak's mother, long thought to have died during World War II, is still alive, and that a pushy reporter's sister killed herself.

With physical therapy, Johnny relearns to walk but retains a limp and must use a cane. Sarah reestablishes contact with him, but she is torn between her love for him and her family. They eventually drift apart.

As news of his gift spreads, Sheriff George Bannerman asks Johnny for help with a series of murders. At first Johnny declines, but he eventually agrees to help. Through a vision at the crime scene, he discovers that deputy Frank Dodd is the killer. Before Bannerman can arrest him, Dodd commits suicide. Dodd's mother shoots Johnny before being killed by Bannerman.

Johnny moves to a different town and lives a more isolated life as he grows physically weaker due to his psychic abilities. Despite Weizak's concerns, Johnny refuses further treatment. He tutors children, working from home. The wealthy Roger Stuart hires Johnny to tutor his son, Chris. Through Stuart, Johnny meets Greg Stillson, a superficially charismatic third-party candidate for the United States Senate, for whom Sarah and her husband, Walt, volunteer. Stuart warns Johnny that Stillson is dangerous.

Johnny receives a vision of Chris and two other boys drowning in a local pond during an ice hockey game. He implores Stuart to change his plans, but he refuses and fires Johnny. Chris, however, stays home and lives, while the two other boys drown. Johnny realizes he has a "dead zone" in his visions, where the future is changeable.

At a political rally, Johnny shakes Stillson's hand and has a vision of Stillson as  President ordering a pre-emptive nuclear strike on the USSR. Johnny seeks out Weizak's advice, asking, for instance, if he would have killed Adolf Hitler if he had the chance, knowing beforehand the atrocities Hitler would commit. Weizak replies that he would have had no choice but to kill him. Johnny leaves Sarah a letter, telling her that what he is about to do will cost him his life, but is a worthwhile sacrifice.

Sarah and her family attend a rally for Stillson. Johnny also sneaks in with a rifle; he shoots at Stillson but misses. In the ensuing commotion, Stillson grabs Sarah's baby and holds him as a human shield, which a photographer captures on film. Before Johnny can fire again, he is shot by Stillson's bodyguard. Johnny touches Stillson's hand and foresees that, after the photograph is published, Stillson's career ends and he commits suicide, thus averting the nuclear attack. Johnny lies dying as Sarah embraces him and tells him that she loves him.

Cast

 Christopher Walken as Johnny Smith
 Brooke Adams as Sarah Bracknell
 Tom Skerritt as Sheriff George Bannerman
 Herbert Lom as Dr. Sam Weizak
 Anthony Zerbe as Roger Stuart
 Colleen Dewhurst as Henrietta Dodd
 Martin Sheen as Greg Stillson
 Nicholas Campbell as Deputy Frank Dodd
 Simon Craig as Chris Stuart
 Géza Kovács as Sonny
 Sean Sullivan as Herb Smith
 Jackie Burroughs as Vera Smith
 Barry Flatman as Walt Bracknell
Peter Dvorsky as Dardis
Leslie Carlson as Brenner

Production

Development
After King's novel The Dead Zone was released in 1979, Lorimar Film Entertainment began developing a film adaptation. Producer Carol Baum gave the book to screenwriter Jeffrey Boam and asked him to write a screenplay. "I saw it had great possibilities and agreed to do it," Boam said. He developed a script with director Stanley Donen, who left the project before the film had reached production at Lorimar. Lorimar eventually closed its film division after a series of box-office failures, and soon after, producer Dino De Laurentiis bought the rights to The Dead Zone. He initially disliked Boam's screenplay and asked King to adapt his own novel. De Laurentiis then reportedly rejected King's script as "involved and convoluted"; however, David Cronenberg, who ultimately directed the film, said that he was the one who decided not to use the script, finding it "needlessly brutal". De Laurentiis rejected a second script by Andrzej Żuławski, eventually returning to Boam. The film was finally on track to be made when De Laurentiis hired producer Debra Hill to work with Cronenberg and Boam.

Boam abandoned King's parallel story structure for The Dead Zones screenplay, turning the plot into separate episodes. Boam told writer Tim Lucas in 1983, "King's book is longer than it needed to be. The novel sprawls and it's episodic. What I did was use that episodic quality, because I saw The Dead Zone as a triptych." His script was revised and condensed four times by Cronenberg, who eliminated large portions of the novel's story, including plot points about Johnny Smith having a brain tumor. Cronenberg, Boam, and Hill had script meetings to revise the screenplay page by page. Boam's "triptych" in the screenplay surrounds three acts: the introduction of Johnny Smith before his car accident and after he awakes from a coma, a story about Smith assisting a sheriff in tracking down the Castle Rock Killer, and finally Johnny deciding to confront the politician Stillson. Boam said he enjoyed writing character development for Smith, having him struggle with the responsibility of his psychic abilities, and ultimately giving up his life for the greater good. "It was this theme that made me like the book, and I particularly enjoyed discovering it in what was essentially a genre piece, a work of exploitation," he said. In Boam's first draft of the screenplay, Johnny does not die at the end, but rather has a vision about the Castle Rock Killer, who is still alive and escaped from prison. Cronenberg insisted that this "trick ending" be revised. Boam submitted the final draft of the screenplay on November 8, 1982.

King is reported to have told Cronenberg that the changes the director and Boam made to the story "improved and intensified the power of the narrative."

Before Christopher Walken was cast as Johnny Smith, Bill Murray was considered for the role as it was King's first choice. Cronenberg initially wanted Nicholas Campbell to portray Johnny, but the director wound up casting him as the Castle Rock Killer instead. Cronenberg also wanted Hal Holbrook to portray Sheriff Bannerman but De Laurentiis objected.

In addition to Donen, both John Badham and Michael Cimino were also considered to direct.

Filming
Shooting started in early January 1983 and took place in the Greater Toronto Area and the Regional Municipality of Niagara of Cronenberg's native Ontario, Canada. The so-called Screaming Tunnel, located in nearby Niagara Falls, Ontario, was also used as the backdrop for one scene. The gazebo was built by the film crew and donated to Niagara-on-the-Lake.

According to a David Cronenberg interview on the DVD, The Dead Zone was filmed during a relentless deep freeze in southern Ontario, which lasted for weeks, creating an authentic atmosphere of subzero temperatures and icy, snow-packed terrain, which made for great natural shooting locations, despite it being almost too cold for cast and crew to tolerate at times. Canada's Wonderland, a theme park 30 km north of Toronto's city limits, was also used as a filming location.

Music
The music soundtrack, composed by Michael Kamen, was recorded by the National Philharmonic Orchestra, London, at the famous EMI Abbey Road Studios. Michael Kamen conducted the recording sessions; the orchestra was contracted and led by Sidney Sax. This is the only Cronenberg film since The Brood (1979) for which Howard Shore was not composer.

Reception 
The Dead Zone received very positive reviews on release. It holds an approval rating of 88% on review aggregator website Rotten Tomatoes based on 50 reviews, with an average score of 7.7/10. The site's consensus reads, "The Dead Zone combines taut direction from David Cronenberg and a rich performance from Christopher Walken to create one of the strongest Stephen King adaptations." On Metacritic, the film has a score of 69 out of 100 based on 8 reviews, indicating "generally favorable reviews".

Roger Ebert of the Chicago Sun-Times gave the film three-and-a-half stars, describing The Dead Zone as by far the best of the half-a-dozen cinematic adaptations of King's novels to that date. He praised Cronenberg's direction for successfully weaving the supernatural into the everyday, and noted believable performances by the entire cast, especially Walken: "Walken does such a good job of portraying Johnny Smith, the man with the strange gift, that we forget this is science fiction or fantasy or whatever and just accept it as this guy's story." Janet Maslin of The New York Times referred to the film as "a well-acted drama more eerie than terrifying, more rooted in the occult than in sheer horror."

Dave Kehr of the Chicago Reader was more critical of the film, describing it as "By no means a bad film, just a disappointingly bland and superficial one ... in which director David Cronenberg relinquishes the one thing that had always set him apart from his Canadian colleagues: his willingness to follow his intuitions rather than the logic of a script."

See also

 List of American films of 1983
 The Dead Zone (TV series), a television series also based on the novel
 "The Ned Zone", a segment of The Simpsons "Treehouse of Horror XV" episode that parodies the novel and film
 "Ed Glosser, Trivial Psychic", a Saturday Night Live sketch featuring Christopher Walken that parodies the film

References

External links

 
 
 
 

1983 films
1983 horror films
1983 science fiction films
1983 independent films
1980s psychological thriller films
American supernatural horror films
American independent films
American political thriller films
1980s English-language films
American supernatural thriller films
Films about assassinations
Films about educators
Films based on American horror novels
Films based on American thriller novels
Films about psychic powers
Films based on works by Stephen King
Films directed by David Cronenberg
Films set in Maine
Films shot in Ontario
Paramount Pictures films
Films scored by Michael Kamen
Films produced by Dino De Laurentiis
Films produced by Debra Hill
Films with screenplays by Jeffrey Boam
Films about precognition
1980s American films
Films about disability